Lake Tambococha (possibly from Quechua tampu inn, qucha lake) is a lake in Peru located in the Huanuco Region, Lauricocha Province, at the border of the districts Cauri and Jesús.

Tampuqucha is situated near an Inca road and near the archaeological site of Tunsukancha (or Tunsunkancha).

See also
List of lakes in Peru

References

Lakes of Peru
Lakes of Huánuco Region